Reality Show? is Taiwanese Mandopop artist Show Lo's eleventh Mandarin studio album. It was released on 20 November 2015 by EMI Taiwan. On 18 December 2015, the SHOW Plus edition (SHOW Plus 真人秀？加場版) was released, featuring two new tracks.

Track listing

Music videos

Charts

References

External links
  羅志祥 官方專屬頻道 Show Lo's Official Youtube Channel

2015 albums
Show Lo albums
Universal Music Taiwan albums